Rattling Run is a tributary of Little Mahanoy Creek in Schuylkill County, Pennsylvania, in the United States. The stream is not designated as an impaired waterbody and is several miles from the Western Middle Anthracite Field. The Gordon Reservoir is located within its watershed. The watershed of Rattling Run is a Coldwater Fishery and a Migratory Fishery.

Course

Rattling Run begins on a mountain in Butler Township. It flows west-southwest for a few tenths of a mile before turning northwest and flowing through the Gordon Reservoir. The stream then turns west-southwest for several tenths of a mile, entering a valley and flowing alongside Highridge Park Road/Gordon Mountain Road. It then turns northwest for several tenths of a mile before turning north-northwest and entering Gordon. Here, it leaves its valley and continues flowing north-northwest. After a few tenths of a mile, it reaches its confluence with Little Mahanoy Creek.

Hydrology
Rattling Run is not designated as an impaired waterbody. In general, the mouth of Rattling Run was found to have a slightly lower pH and slightly lower nutrient concentrations than Little Mahanoy Creek.

Geography and geology

Rattling Run is a few miles to the south of the Western Middle Anthracite Field. The stream has experienced some erosion along the sides and bottom of its channel.

Watershed
The mouth of the stream is in the United States Geological Survey quadrangle of Ashland. However, its source is in the quadrangle of Minersville.

A reservoir known as the Gordon Reservoir is on Rattling Run. In 1970, it was owned by the Butler Township Water Company.

The designated use for Rattling Run is aquatic life.

Rattling Run flooded during Hurricane Agnes in April 1972, causing $350,000 in damage and significant damage to nearby structures.

History
Rattling Run was entered into the Geographic Names Information System on August 2, 1979. Its identifier in the Geographic Names Information System is 1184693.

Rattling Run was stocked with 1000 adult and yearling rainbow trout at least once in the early 1900s. Improvements were made to the stream in 1937. Flood control proposals for Rattling Run in Gordon were made in 1976.

In June 1991, it was reported that raw sewage was being piped from homes directly into Rattling Run and Little Mahanoy Creek.

Biology
In 2001, neither fish nor macroinvertebrates were observed in Rattling Run at Gordon. The stream is classified as a Coldwater Fishery and a Migratory Fishery.

See also
List of rivers of Pennsylvania
List of tributaries of Mahanoy Creek

References

Further reading

External links
USGS 0155521486 Rattling Run at Gordon, PA

Rivers of Schuylkill County, Pennsylvania
Tributaries of Mahanoy Creek
Rivers of Pennsylvania